Mandisa Stevenson (born February 4, 1982) is an American professional women's basketball player with the Phoenix Mercury of the Women's National Basketball Association. She attended high school in Decatur, Alabama before playing basketball at Auburn University.

Auburn statistics
Source

Basketball career
As a rookie with the San Antonio Silver Stars in 2004, Stevenson's best performance came on July 1 in Seattle, when she scored a season-high nine points in only 18 minutes. A free agent after the season, Stevenson signed with the Seattle Storm on April 21. Stevenson appeared in four games for the Storm, tallying six points and grabbing six rebounds in 53 minutes of action, before being placed on the Injured List with lower back pain on June 6. Stevenson was the surprise Opening Day starter at small forward, scoring two points and grabbing four rebounds. Stevenson subsequently returned to the bench as a backup post, but lost playing time when Suzy Batkovic joined the team. Despite Anne Donovan's glowing praise of her she was waived on July 6, 2005.

On March 21, 2007, the Phoenix Mercury announced they had added Stevenson to the team's training camp roster.

References

External links
WNBA Player Profile
Storm Waives Stevenson
Mercury Add Stevenson to Camp Roster

1982 births
Living people
American women's basketball players
Auburn Tigers women's basketball players
Basketball players from Alabama
Junior college women's basketball players in the United States
Sportspeople from Decatur, Alabama
Phoenix Mercury players
San Antonio Stars players
Seattle Storm players
Undrafted Women's National Basketball Association players
Centers (basketball)
Power forwards (basketball)